Tučepi is a small town and municipality in the Split-Dalmatia County of Croatia. It is located on the Adriatic coast of Dalmatia known as Makarska riviera, about 5 km southeast of Makarska, population 1,763 (2001). It is a popular tourist destination thanks to its scenic coastline, its opportunities for sports and its excellent accommodation.

History
The settlement of Tučepi was first settled four thousand years ago by the Illyrians. Until the earthquake of 1962, the majority of its inhabitants were living in scattered hamlets like Gornji Tučepi, Podpeč, Čovići, Srida Sela, Šimići and Podstup at the lower foot of the mountain Biokovo and since the 18th century these towns have seen a gradual process of depopulation, as their inhabitants began moving down to Tučepi-Kraj, now a 4-km long resort. Name from the Slavic tucha cloud

Legend
According to a local folk legend, the Venetian Doge Pietro I Candiano is buried here. In fact, the first of the four Venetian Doges of the Candiano family, Pietro, died on 18 September 887 in a battle against the Croatian tribe of Neretvans who defeated the Venetian fleet near Makarska. After his defeat the Venetians made a treaty with Prince Branimir in 888, agreeing to pay  a tribute to the Croatian rulers for the right to sail and trade unmolested along the Adriatic, which they had to adhere to until the end of the 10th century.

Notable natives and residents
Marin Brbić, former president of Hajduk Split
Dražen Lalić, sociologist
Žanamari Lalić, singer
Ani Mijačika, tennis player

See also
 List of mountains in Croatia

References

External links

 Tourist Board Tučepi
 Tučepi Photos
 Doge Pietro I Candiano died on 18 September 887 in a battle against Narentines

Municipalities of Croatia
Populated places in Split-Dalmatia County
Populated coastal places in Croatia
Seaside resorts in Croatia